Legnickie Pole  (in 1945–1948 Dobre Pole) is a village in Legnica County, Lower Silesian Voivodeship, in south-western Poland. It is the seat of the administrative district (gmina) called Gmina Legnickie Pole.

The village has a population of 780.

History 

The village was the site of the decisive Battle of Legnica during the first Mongol invasion of Poland on 9 April 1241. In the battle, Mongols led by Kadan and Baidar defeated a Polish army aided by western volunteers under command of Duke Henry II the Pious of Silesia. The Mongols annihilated their opponents and joined with the main army in Hungary, but upon receiving the news of the death of their Grand Khan Ögedei Khan, they turned back to attend to the election of a new Khagan, or Grand Khan.

As a result of the fragmentation of Poland into smaller duchies, the village was part of the Silesia until 1248 and the Duchy of Legnica afterwards, remaining under the rule of the Piast dynasty until its extinction in 1675. Afterwards it was incorporated into the Habsburg-ruled Kingdom of Bohemia. During the Thirty Years' War the village was plundered by the Swedes.

The village was annexed by the Kingdom of Prussia during the Silesian Wars in 1742. During the Napoleonic Wars, the Prussian general Prince Blücher defeated a French army under Marshal MacDonald at the Kaczawa river (then Katzbach), a small river running through Legnickie Pole (then Wahlstatt) and Legnica (then Liegnitz), in the Battle of Katzbach on 26 August 1813. In honor of this victory Blücher received the title Prince of Wahlstatt on 3 June 1814. A Baroque abbey built before the Prussian annexation, in 1727 through 1733, with its complex of attendant buildings became a Prussian training institute for cadets in 1840. Among others, future field marshal and German president Paul von Hindenburg studied here from 1859 to 1863, as did the Red Baron, Manfred von Richthofen, until 1911.

As the Treaty of Versailles limited the size of the German military, the abbey was turned into a boarding school for boys in 1920. During the Nazi era, it was first a National Political Institute of Education and in the final months of the war a prisoner of war camp Oflag VIII-F for French, Yugoslav and Soviet troops was located there.

The village became part of People's Republic of Poland following the Nazi Germany's defeat in World War II, had its German-speaking population expelled, and was given its current Polish name Legnickie Pole ("Field of Legnica", from 1945 to 1948 it was named Dobre Pole ["Good Field"]).

Landmarks
 St. Jadwiga's Basilica and the Benedictines monastery, a Baroque abbey built between 1727 and 1733 with its complex of attendant buildings. The former abbey became a hospital for emotionally disturbed women in 1957, while the church remains a Catholic parish church
 Museum of the Battle of Legnica, dedicated to the 1241 battle, one of the largest battles of medieval Poland, located in the former Holy Trinity Church

The St. Jadwiga's Basilica and abbey along with the Museum of the Battle of Legnica were jointly designated one of Poland's official national Historic Monuments (Pomnik historii) on May 1, 2004, and are tracked by the National Heritage Board of Poland.

References

External links
 Official website 
 Gmina website 

Villages in Legnica County